Andropolia theodori is a moth in the family Noctuidae first described by Augustus Radcliffe Grote in 1878. It is found in the eastern parts of North America, from British Columbia, south to California.

The wingspan is 43–55 mm.

The larvae feed on Ceanothus velutinus and Holodiscus discolor.

Subspecies
Andropolia theodori theodori (Colorado)
Andropolia theodori epichysis (California)
Andropolia theodori vancouvera (British Columbia)

References

External links

Acronictinae
Moths of North America
Moths described in 1878